Sir Charles Edward Warde, 1st Baronet (20 December 1845 – 12 April 1937) was a Conservative Party politician in England who served as a Member of Parliament (MP) from 1892 to 1918.

He was born in Ireland, the son of General Sir Edward Warde and his wife Jane Lane.

He was elected to the House of Commons at his first attempt, at the 1892 general election, for the Medway constituency, and held that seat until the constituency was abolished for the 1918 general election. He did not stand for Parliament again.

He was an officer in the 4th (Queen's Own) Hussars, and on 13 September 1899 was appointed Lieutenant Colonel in command of the West Kent Yeomanry (Queen's Own). He was granted the honorary rank of colonel on 31 January 1900.

In 1908, he was appointed a deputy lieutenant of Kent. He was made a baronet on 11 September 1919, of Barham Court in the Parish of Teston in the County of Kent.

He died in 1937 in Barham Court, after which the baronetcy became extinct. He had married Helen Caroline de Stern.

References

External links 
 

1845 births
1937 deaths
Conservative Party (UK) MPs for English constituencies
Deputy Lieutenants of Kent
UK MPs 1892–1895
UK MPs 1895–1900
UK MPs 1900–1906
UK MPs 1906–1910
UK MPs 1910
UK MPs 1910–1918
Baronets in the Baronetage of the United Kingdom
Queen's Own West Kent Yeomanry officers
Stern family (banking)